Jacek Władysław Włosowicz (born 25 January 1966) is a Polish politician. He was elected to the Senate of Poland (10th term) representing the constituency of Kielce. He was also elected to the 6th term and 9th term of the Senate of Poland.

References 

Living people
1966 births
Place of birth missing (living people)
20th-century Polish politicians
21st-century Polish politicians
Members of the Senate of Poland 2005–2007
Members of the Senate of Poland 2015–2019
Members of the Senate of Poland 2019–2023